Robert Leighton (died 17 January 2008 from Morbus Crohn) was an English broadcaster and DJ on Radio Caroline and a licensed Amateur Radio operator.

Imagination Radio 
'IMAGINATION' came about as a therapeutic way of passing the time whilst recovering from that illness.
TIME: Each Thursday evening between 8pm and midnight UK time (1900 to 2300 UTC European summer, 2000 to 0000 UTC European winter).
FREQUENCY: First via Shortwave, later as part of Radio Caroline via the Astra satellites at 19.2° east and 28.2° east (from UK), first in analogue as a subcarrier of the Travel Shop TV program, later in digital.

External links
Radio Caroline - Rob Leighton Obituary
 German article about Rob Leighton
Rob Leighton Interview by Roland Beaney

2008 deaths
British radio people
1956 births